USS Serpens (AK-97) was a   commissioned by the United States Navy for service in World War II. She was the first ship of the US Navy to have this name: she is named after Serpens, a constellation in the northern hemisphere. Serpens was crewed by United States Coast Guard personnel and was responsible for delivering troops, goods and equipment to locations in the Asiatic-Pacific Theater.

Construction
Serpens was laid down on 10 March 1943, under a Maritime Commission (MARCOM) contract, MC hull 739, as the Liberty ship SS Benjamin N. Cardozo, by California Shipbuilding Corporation, Terminal Island, Los Angeles, California; launched on 5 April 1943; sponsored by Mrs. H.P. Needham; transferred to the Navy on 19 April 1943; renamed Serpens and designated AK-97; and commissioned at San Diego on 28 May 1943.

Service history
Following shakedown off southern California, Serpens loaded general cargo at Alameda and, on 24 June, sailed west to assume provision ship duties in support of operations in the Solomons. By mid-July, she was in the Tonga Islands. At the end of the month, she was en route from New Caledonia to New Zealand; and, by mid-August, she had emptied her holds at Wellington. She then took on more cargo; returned to New Caledonia; and commenced a series of short hauls to Viti Levu, Tutuila, Penrhyn, Bora Bora, Aitutaki, and Tongatapu.

On 9 November, Serpens returned to New Caledonia. In early December, she moved into the southern Solomons; and, after completing a Florida Island-Banika Island run, she stood off Lunga Point, Guadalcanal, to load cargo for Bougainville. During January 1944, she completed two runs into Empress Augusta Bay. In February, she was ordered back to New Zealand for dry-docking before loading dry provisions.

For the next four months, Serpens delivered consignments to bases in the New Hebrides and the Solomons, returning to New Zealand to reload only once. In July, she was at Purvis Bay for the installation of SF-1 radar. She then resumed operations and, through October, carried general cargo and rolling stock between ports and anchorages in the Solomons. In mid-November, she loaded repairable vehicles from the Russells and from Guadalcanal and sailed for New Zealand where, after offloading, three of her holds were converted for ammunition stowage.

Destruction, 29 January 1945
Late in December 1944, the Liberty ship commenced loading at Wellington, finished it at Auckland, and returned to the Solomons in mid-January 1945. Late in the evening on 29 January 1945, Serpens was anchored off Lunga Beach. The commanding officer and seven others, one officer and six enlisted men, were ashore. The remaining crewmen were loading depth charges into her holds when Serpens exploded. After the explosion, only the bow of the ship was visible. The rest had disintegrated, and the bow sank soon afterward. One hundred ninety-six Coast Guard crewmen, 57 Army stevedores, and a Public Health Service physician, Dr. Harry M. Levin, were killed in the explosion, and a soldier ashore was killed by shrapnel.  Only two of those on board, Seaman (SN) 1/c Kelsie K. Kemp and SN 1/c George S. Kennedy, who had been in the boatswain's locker, survived.

An eyewitness to the disaster stated: "As we headed our personnel boat shoreward the sound and concussion of the explosion suddenly reached us, and, as we turned, we witnessed the awe-inspiring death drama unfold before us. As the report of screeching shells filled the air and the flash of tracers continued, the water splashed throughout the harbor as the shells hit. We headed our boat in the direction of the smoke and as we came into closer view of what had once been a ship, the water was filled only with floating debris, dead fish, torn life jackets, lumber and other unidentifiable objects. The smell of death, and fire, and gasoline, and oil was evident and nauseating. This was sudden death, and horror, unwanted and unasked for, but complete."

Lieutenant Commander Stinson reported: "I felt and saw two flashes after which only the bow of the ship was visible. The rest had disintegrated and the bow sank soon afterwards." The two survivors, SN 1/c Kemp and SN 1/c Kennedy, according to Stinson, ". . .showed a lot of savvy by grabbing a couple of water lights that we kept stowed in the [boatswain's] locker. They used them to attract attention when they climbed out onto the floating portion of the bow." Both men were injured but were rescued by a base commander in the area.

At first report the incident was attributed to enemy action but a court of inquiry later determined that the cause of the explosion could not be established from the remaining evidence and by 1949, the Navy noted that the loss was not due to enemy action but due to an "accident intrinsic to the loading process." The loss of Serpens remains the largest single disaster ever suffered by the Coast Guard.  The dead were initially buried at the Army, Navy and Marine Corps Cemetery at Guadalcanal. Their remains were later exhumed and taken to Arlington National Cemetery where they were interred on 15 June 1949. A large monument in their honor was erected over the grave site and dedicated on 16 November 1950.

As of 2019, there is an active effort to reexamine the sinking to see if it was caused by a Japanese submarine.

The wreck is located at:

Awards
Serpens earned one battle star for her World War II service.

See also
 West Loch disaster
 USS Mount Hood (AE-11)
 Port Chicago disaster
 List of accidents and incidents involving transport or storage of ammunition

Notes 

Citations

Bibliography 

Online resources

Further reading
 The Long Blue Line Disrupted: USS Serpens (AK-97) and the Largest Loss of Life in US Coast Guard History (co-authors Douglas E. Campbell and Robert G. Breen); ISBN 978-0-359-87305-0

External links
 
 USS Serpens Photo Gallery
 Roll of Honor

 

Crater-class cargo ships
World War II auxiliary ships of the United States
Ships sunk by non-combat internal explosions
Shipwrecks in Ironbottom Sound
World War II shipwrecks in the Pacific Ocean
Ships built in Los Angeles
1943 ships
Maritime incidents in January 1945